Giuseppe Caruso (12 October 1934 – 7 March 2019), best known as Pino Caruso, was an Italian actor, author and television personality.

Life and career 
Caruso was born in Palermo, Sicily and debuted as dramatic stage actor in his home town in 1957. In 1965 he moved to Rome and entered the theater company "Il Bagaglino". He gained a great popularity taking part to several RAI variety shows such as Che domenica amici (1968), Gli amici della domenica (1970), Teatro 10 (1971),Dove sta Zazà (1973), Mazzabubù (1975), Due come noi (1979).

Caruso was the president of the Italian Actors Union from 1979 to 1989.

From 1995 to 1997, upon appointment by Palermo Mayor Leoluca Orlando, Caruso planned and directed Palermo in scena, a two-months artistic and theatrical Festival (held from 14 July to 14 September). In 2001, the Extraordinary Commissioner of the city Ettore Serio called Caruso to repeat the experience. 
	
Since 1976 Caruso also collaborated regularly with newspapers and magazines, being columnist among others for daily newspapers Il Mattino, Il Messaggero, Paese Sera, L'Avanti, Il Tempo, La Sicilia. He was also author of numerous books, ranging from various genres.

He took part in approximately 30 films, debuting as director in 1977 with the film Ride bene chi ride ultimo.

He was married to stage actress Marilisa Ferzetti and was the father of the voice actor Francesco Caruso. He was a life-long vegetarian.

Selected filmography 
 The Most Beautiful Couple in the World (1968) - Carmelo Miccichè
 La main (1969) - Marco - le cycliste
 Gli infermieri della mutua (1969) - Dr. Borselli
 Atlantic Wall (1970) - Friedrich
 Quella piccola differenza (1970) - Marino Marini
 Gli amici degli amici hanno saputo (1973) - Vincenzino Cipolla
 Malicious (1973) - Don Cirillo
 Seduction (1973) - Alfredo
 La governante (1974) - Enrico Platania
 The Common Man (1975) - Vigorelli
 L'ammazzatina (1975) - Mimì Galluzzo
 Lips of Lurid Blue (1975) - Don Gino
 The Sunday Woman (1975) - Police Commissioner De Palma
 Tell Me You Do Everything for Me (1976) - The Police Commissioner
 Il marito in collegio (1977) - Barone Filippo Pancaldi
 Il... Belpaese (1977) - Ovidio Camorrà
 Ride bene chi ride ultimo (1977) - Giuseppe Tarluto (segment "Sedotto e violentato")
 Gegè Bellavita (1978) - The Duke Attanasi
 Il ficcanaso (1980) - Commissioner
 L'esercito più pazzo del mondo (1981) - Capitano Parabellum
 Canto d'amore (1982)
 Scugnizzi (1989) - The judge
 La strategia della maschera (1998) - Don Ciccio Bova
 La matassa (2009) - Don Gino
 Abbraccialo per me (2016) - Don Pino

Bibliography 
 L'uomo comune, 1985, Novecento
 I delitti di via della Loggia, 1991, Novecento
 Il diluvio universale. Acqua passata, 1995, Novecento
 L'uomo comune (edizione rinnovata), 2005, Marsilio
 Il silenzio dell'ultima notte, 2009, Flaccovio editore
 Appartengo a una generazione che deve ancora nascere (aforismi storie, personaggi e ragionamenti sullo stato attuale del mondo), 2014, ERI-RAI (Mondadori)
 'Il senso  dell'umorismo è l'espressione più alta della serietà" (aforismi storie, personaggi e ragionamenti sullo stato attuale del mondo), 2017, Alpes editore
 'Se si scopre che sono onesto, nessuno si fiderà più di me" (aforismi storie, personaggi e ragionamenti sullo stato attuale del mondo),1017, Alpes editore

References

External links 

 

1934 births
2019 deaths
Mass media people from Palermo
20th-century Italian novelists
20th-century Italian male writers
21st-century Italian novelists
Italian male stage actors
Italian television presenters
Italian male film actors
Italian comedians
Male actors from Palermo
Italian male novelists
Aphorists
21st-century Italian male writers
Writers from Palermo